Marrowbone Creek may refer to:

Marrowbone Creek (Missouri)
Marrowbone Creek (Tennessee)
Marrowbone Creek (West Virginia)